The Colombian presidential line of succession is the order which the vice president and other officers of the Colombian national Government assume the powers and duties of the Colombian presidency (or the office itself, in the instance of succession by the vice president) upon an elected president's death, resignation, removal from office upon impeachment conviction or incapacity.

The order of succession specifies that the position passes to the vice president; if the vice presidency is simultaneously vacant, or if the vice president is also incapacitated, the powers and duties of the presidency pass to the president of the Senate, the president of the Chamber of Representatives, and then to the cabinet ministers, according to their respective orders of succession.

Current order of succession
The current presidential order of succession and origin was revised through article 17 of Law 1444 of 2011, which establishes that the order of succession will be established as follows. The vice president will be at the head of this, and will be followed by the challenge of members of the executive branch in their respective order of origin. The table shows the current presidential order of succession.

References

Government of Colombia
Presidency of Colombia